The Leader of the Opposition in South Australia is the leader of the largest minority political party or coalition of parties, known as the Opposition, in the House of Assembly of the Parliament of South Australia. By convention, the leader of the opposition is a member of the House of Assembly. The leader acts as the public face of the opposition, and acts as a chief critic of the government and ultimately attempt to portray the opposition as a feasible alternate government. They are also given certain additional rights under parliamentary standing orders, such as extended time limits for speeches. Should the opposition win an election, the Leader of the Opposition will be nominated to become the Premier of South Australia.

Before the 1890s when there was no formal party system in South Australia, MPs tended to have historical liberal or conservative beliefs. The liberals dominated government from the 1893 election to 1905 election with Labor support, with the conservatives mostly in opposition. Labor took government with the support of eight dissident liberals in 1905 when Labor won the most seats for the first time. The rise of Labor saw non-Labor politics start to merge into various party incarnations. The two independent conservative parties, the Australasian National League (formerly National Defence League) and the Farmers and Producers Political Union merged with the Liberal and Democratic Union to become the Liberal Union in 1910. Labor formed South Australia's first majority government after winning the 1910 state election, triggering the merger. The 1910 election came two weeks after federal Labor formed Australia's first elected majority government at the 1910 federal election.

In an historical record, Steven Marshall was the fifth consecutive Liberal opposition leader during their 2002 to 2018 opposition period. In comparison, every former Labor opposition leader for over half a century would also proceed to serve as Premier.

List of leaders of the opposition in South Australia

The following is a list of leaders of the opposition in South Australia, from 1884 to present. According to the official parliament record, prior to the year 1884 "no definite evidence of the official holder of the office could be found".

See also
 Premier of South Australia

References
Statistical Record of the Legislature 1836 to 2007, p.118-119 – parliament.sa.gov.au

South Australia
 
Opposition